Spice SE89 may refer to:
Spice SE89C, a group C sports prototype racing car
Spice SE89P, an IMSA GTP sports prototype racing car